The Basler BT-67 is a utility aircraft produced by Basler Turbo Conversions of Oshkosh, Wisconsin. It is a remanufactured and modified Douglas DC-3; the modifications are designed to significantly extend the DC-3's serviceable lifetime.

Design and development
Basler Turbo Conversions was founded in 1990 solely focus on converting existing C-47 airframes into the BT-67. Basler custom configures each new build to the clients specifications. Industries served include cargo, military, cloudseeding, scientific research, and various other applications. The conversion includes fitting the airframe with new Pratt & Whitney Canada PT6A-67R turboprop engines, lengthening the fuselage, strengthening the airframe, upgrading the avionics, and making modifications to the wing leading edges and wingtips.

Gunship version
The Basler BT-67 has a gunship version used by the Air Forces of Colombia . The Colombian gunships are equipped with a forward-looking infrared (FLIR) ball, enabling the aircraft to conduct effective nighttime missions.

Operators

Military
 
 Colombian Air Force
 National Police of Colombia 
 
 El Salvador Air Force
 
 Guatemalan Air Force
 
Mali Air Force
 
 Mauritanian Air Force
 
 Royal Thai Air Force

Civilian

 Australian Antarctic Division

 North Star Air
 Kenn Borek Air

 Polar Research Institute of China 

 Alfred Wegener Institute

 United States Forest Service

Accidents and incidents

As of 2019, a total 15 BT-67 have been involved in crashes or other incidents since the 1990s.

Specifications (BT-67)

See also

References

External links

 Basler Turbo Conversions, LLC
 The Antarctic Sun "A Timeless Machine Returns"
 The Antarctic Sun "Modern plane and old history maker, are birds of a feather"
 Global article

BT-67
1990s United States civil utility aircraft
Low-wing aircraft
Douglas DC-3
Aircraft first flown in 1990
Twin-turboprop tractor aircraft